Electrek is an American news website dedicated to electric transportation and sustainable energy. Electrek is known for its extensive, positive coverage of electric transportation in general and Tesla specifically. Their positive coverage of Tesla has been criticized by some automotive journalists.
Its main authors have disclosed ownership of Tesla stock, substantial profit from referrals to Tesla, and ownership of Tesla cars. The owner, Seth Weintraub, also disclosed near total divestment from Tesla stock on January 14, 2020.

References

External links

American technology news websites
Internet properties established in 2012
Transport websites
Electric vehicles
Sustainable energy
Automotive websites